Melissa Jane Bulow (born 13 June 1980) is an Australian cricketer.  She has appeared in two Test matches, 19 One Day Internationals and 2 Twenty20 Internationals for her country.

She announced her retirement from international cricket in November 2012.
Bulow is the 149th woman to play Test cricket for Australia, and the 98th woman to play One Day International cricket for Australia.

References

1980 births
Australia women One Day International cricketers
Australia women Test cricketers
Australia women Twenty20 International cricketers
Cricketers from Queensland
Living people
Sportspeople from Ipswich, Queensland
Queensland cricketers